Senator Herron may refer to:

Roy Herron (born 1953), Tennessee State Senate
Lars Herseth (born 1946), South Dakota State Senate